Chorki is a Bangladeshi subscription-based over-the-top media service and original programming production company, owned by Transcom Group via Prothom Alo subsidiary of Mediastar Limited, and was launched on 12 July 2021 worldwide. The service primarily shows original content and content from other third-party providers, including television series, films, and documentaries. The service is available in an ad-free version with limited content, while the premium tier includes a larger content library including original shows and films.

Background and history 
Bangladesh has become a growing market for OTT. Foreign streaming services were doing business in Bangladesh successfully. But there were very little local content. To fill the gap Mediastar Ltd. came forward, and in 2020, they announced to launch an OTT platform in next year and named it Chorki.  In April 2021, Indian High Commission of Dhaka shares 38 documentary films with Chorki. Early 2021, it was told that 3 June 2021 would be the launching date. But later, it was delayed to July 2021. On 12 July 2021, a launching ceremony was held on online due to the lockdown of the COVID-19 pandemic and Chorki started its journey with a motto - Film, Fun, Foorti. Jaya Ahsan and many more stars joined in online in this opening ceremony. Chorki is currently available for Android, iOS, Apple TV, Amazon Fire TV, Android TV, Samsung Smart TV. Chorki won the Best Digital Diversification Project award at the Bangladesh Media Innovation Awards 2022 held in September 2022.

Content 
Chorki mainly focuses on Bangla language content. They also show Turkish and Iranian films with Bangla dubbed version. They have two categories of contents premium and free respectively. To watch premium content subscription is required. They offer a wide variety of video content such as movies, series, Shows, non-fiction Content, Music Video, Chorki Original content, and many more Bangla and foreign language video contents. They started their journey with over 200 titles of films, TV series, documentaries, TV dramas, etc.

Technology Partner 
Chorki has partnered with leading global streaming and OTT solution provider, ViewLift to power its on-demand video streaming service. Chorki platform uses AVOD, SVOD and TVOD models to monetize its content.

Original programming

Feature films

Drama

Comedy

Documentaries

TV Shorts

Exclusive programming

Foreign Films

Foreign series

Chorki Selects

References

External links
 Official Website

Entertainment companies of Bangladesh
Internet television streaming services in Bangladesh
Companies based in Dhaka
Bangladeshi entertainment websites
Bangladeshi companies established in 2021